The Blue Mesa Member is a member of the Chinle Formation. It is located in the Petrified Forest National Park of northeast Arizona.

Geology
The colorful bands of mudstone and sandstone were laid down during the Triassic, when the area was part of a huge tropical floodplain.

See also

Chinle Formation

Gallery

References

Literature
Blakey, and Ranney, 2008. Ancient Landscapes of the Colorado Plateau, Ron Blakey, Wayne Ranney, c 2008, Grand Canyon Association (publisher), 176 pages, with Appendix, Glossary, Index. Contains approximately 75 shaded topographic maps, for geology, etc., with 54 (23 pairs, (46)) for Colorado Plateau specifically; others are global, or North American.
 Utah DeLorme Atlas & Gazetteer, 7th Edition, c. 2010, 64 pages, pp. 24, 32.

Chinle Formation
Triassic Arizona